The Cape Cod National Seashore (CCNS) encompasses  on Cape Cod, in Massachusetts. CCNS was created on August 7, 1961, by President John F. Kennedy, when he signed a bill enacting the legislation he first co-sponsored as a Senator a few years prior. It includes ponds, woods and beachfront of the Atlantic coastal pine barrens ecoregion. It is administered by the National Park Service.

Places of interest

Notable sites encompassed by the CCNS include Marconi Station (site of the first two-way transatlantic radio transmission), the Highlands Center for the Arts (formerly the North Truro Air Force Station), the Dune Shacks of Peaked Hill Bars Historic District (a 1,950-acre historic district containing dune shacks and the dune environment), and the glacial erratic known as Doane Rock.

A former United States Coast Guard station on the ocean in Truro is now operated as a 42-bed youth hostel by Hostelling International USA.

There are several paved bike trails:

 Nauset Bike Trail—Eastham
 Head of the Meadow Trail—Truro
 Province Lands Trails—Provincetown

There are several excellent beaches along the coastline with public facilities available seasonally. These include Race Point Beach in Provincetown and Coast Guard Beach in Eastham. Both of these have made "top beaches in the US" lists over the years.

Fauna local to the area 
You can find many species of animals, depending on the time of year you visit. In the fall, you may see a kaleidoscope of Monarch butterflies. In the winter, you can find harbor seals and red-throated loons.  In spring, you may see a woodcox doing their mating rituals, or whales out in the ocean. Summer brings plovers and songbirds like orioles and warblers. Other animals you may see around Cape Cod National Seashore include the great blue heron, mute swans, bald eagles, and peregrine falcons.

Amphibians seen at CCNS wetland areas include Fowler's Toads and Eastern Spadefoot toads.

Restoration and conservation efforts
As part of the NPS Centennial Initiative, the Herring River estuary will be restored to its natural state through removal of dikes and drains that date back to 1909.

In 2010, the North of Highland Campground was protected with a conservation easement. The Trust for Public Land, the Association to Preserve Cape Cod, the Truro Conservation Trust, and other groups led a grassroots campaign to support the funding for the purchase price of the conservation easement from the federal Land and Water Conservation Fund (LWCF), secured by U.S. Senator John Kerry, U.S. Representative Bill Delahunt, and former Senator Ted Kennedy.

The Biddle Property, home of the late Francis Biddle, who was the U.S. attorney general during WWII and served as the primary American judge during the post-war Nuremberg trials, was added to the Cape Cod National Seashore in 2011. Using funding from the Land and Water Conservation Fund, the Trust for Public Land purchased the property and conveyed it to the National Park Service.

As part of the restoration efforts, a number of run-down and unsafe buildings of no historical significance will be removed from areas around CCNS and the affected lands will be restored. The Great American Outdoors Act (GAOA) has provided more than $8 million to oversee this project that is to begin in 2023.

Gallery

See also
 Coast Guard Beach (Eastham, Massachusetts)
 East Harbor
 National Register of Historic Places listings in Cape Cod National Seashore
 Nauset Light Beach
 Race Point Light

References

External links

 Cape Cod National Seashore. National Park Service website.
 Coastal Landforms and Processes at the Cape Cod National Seashore, Massachusetts: A Primer U.S. Geological Survey
 Park map showing roads, beaches, and trails. National Park Service map pdf.
 "The Penniman House: A Whaling Story". A National Park Service Teaching with Historic Places (TwHP) lesson plan.
 Portnoy, J. W. et al.,  Kettle Pond Data Atlas for Cape Cod National Seashore: Paleoecology and Modern Water Chemistry April 2001, 118 pp., Retrieved June 23, 2018.

 
1961 establishments in Massachusetts
Chatham, Massachusetts
Eastham, Massachusetts
Landforms of Barnstable County, Massachusetts
Beaches of Massachusetts
Landmarks in Barnstable County, Massachusetts
Massachusetts natural resources
National Park Service areas in Massachusetts
National Seashores of the United States
Orleans, Massachusetts
Protected areas of Barnstable County, Massachusetts
Protected areas established in 1961
Provincetown, Massachusetts
Tourist attractions in Barnstable County, Massachusetts
Truro, Massachusetts
Wellfleet, Massachusetts